Andrei Kuznetsov may refer to:
 Andrei Borisovich Kuznetsov (born 1988), Russian footballer
 Andrey Kuznetsov (politician) (born 1972), Russian politician
 Andrey Kuznetsov (tennis) (born 1991), Russian tennis player
 Andrei Kuznetsov (volleyball) (1966–1994), Soviet volleyball player who participated in the 1988 Olympics
 Andrei Kuznetsov (1873–1984), also known as Father Akaki, a Russian-born monk and Finnish supercentenarian
 Andrei Kuznetsov (ice hockey), Russian hockey player who participated in the 2005 World Junior Ice Hockey Championships